Nathaniel Goldfinger (August 20, 1916 – July 22, 1976) was an American economist and researcher with labor group AFL-CIO for 13 years. He was the Director of the AFL-CIO Department of Research from 1963 until his death in 1976.

His work landed him on the master list of Nixon political opponents.

The library of the George Meany Center in Silver Spring, MD  is named after him.

References

External links
CIO and AFL-CIO Research Department, Nathaniel Goldfinger records, at the University of Maryland libraries

1916 births
1976 deaths
20th-century American economists
Nixon's Enemies List